Miguel Ángel Zavala Ortiz (24 December 1905 – 20 May 1982) was an Argentinian lawyer and diplomat. He was Minister of Foreign Affairs during the presidency of Arturo Umberto Illia between 1963 and 1966 and is remembered for the efforts to reach the United Nations General Assembly Resolution 2065, considered a goal in the Argentina's claim of Falkland Islands.

He was born in San Luis and entered in politics as a law student into the Socialist Party, although his father was a known radical leader. He graduated at Law in the University of Buenos Aires. 

In 1932 he joined the Radical Civic Union, accusing the "patriotic fraud" during the presidency of Agustín P. Justo. Between 1948 and 1952 he was elected National Deputy. He was key figure in the support of the coup d'état against Juan Domingo Perón.

References 

People from San Luis, Argentina
Socialist Party (Argentina) politicians
Foreign ministers of Argentina
1905 births
1982 deaths
20th-century Argentine lawyers
Radical Civic Union politicians
Members of the Argentine Chamber of Deputies elected in Córdoba
20th-century Argentine politicians